Ethan Rupert Pinnock (born 29 May 1993) is a professional footballer who plays as a centre-back for  club Brentford and the Jamaica national team.

Pinnock began his career in non-League football with Dulwich Hamlet and Forest Green Rovers, before rising to prominence in the English Football League with Barnsley, from whom he transferred to Brentford in 2019. He was capped by England C during his non-League career and later represented Jamaica at full international level.

Club career

Dulwich Hamlet
Beginning his career as a left winger or left back, Pinnock played in the Millwall academy between the ages of 9 and 15. Following spells with Fisher Athletic London and AFC Wimbledon, Pinnock entered the youth system at Isthmian League club Dulwich Hamlet. He progressed to be fringe member of the first team squad during the 2010–11 season, which included a spell on loan at Kent County League Premier Division club Holmesdale, during which he was deployed as a utility player. A growth spurt led to Pinnock being converted into a central defender during his time with the club. To that point, he had also been deployed as a central midfielder.

By the 2014–15 season, Pinnock had established himself as Dulwich Hamlet captain and a mainstay of the team. He was a part of the club's 2012–13 Division One South-winning team and won the club's Player of the Year awards in the 2014–15 and 2015–16 seasons. Pinnock departed Dulwich Hamlet in June 2016, after making 195 appearances and scoring 12 goals during his time at Champion Hill.

Forest Green Rovers
On 21 June 2016, Pinnock signed a two-year contract with National League club Forest Green Rovers for an undisclosed fee. He made 45 appearances and scored three goals during Rovers' 2016–17 National League playoffs-winning season, which saw the club promoted to the EFL for the first time in its history. Pinnock departed the club in June 2017.

Barnsley
On 30 June 2017, Pinnock signed a three-year contract with Championship club Barnsley for an undisclosed fee, reported to be £500,000, plus add-ons. Down the pecking order during the first half of the 2017–18 season, injuries to other players allowed him to break into the starting lineup during December 2017 and January 2018. Pinnock scored his first two goals for the club in league matches versus Reading and Sunderland either side of the New Year. He finished an injury-affected 2017–18 season with 15 appearances and suffered relegation with the club to League One.

Pinnock missed just two matches in all competitions during the 2018–19 season and helped the Tykes to automatic promotion back to the Championship. He won the club's Player of the Year award and was named in the PFA and EFL League One Team of the Year selections. Pinnock departed Oakwell on 2 July 2019, after making 67 appearances and scoring three goals for Barnsley.

Brentford
On 2 July 2019, Pinnock signed a three-year contract with Championship club Brentford, with the option of a further year, for an undisclosed fee, reported to be £3 million. He displaced Julian Jeanvier and broke into the team alongside Pontus Jansson in November 2019 and his performances after the season restart in June and July 2020 saw him nominated for the PFA Fans' Player of the Month award. Pinnock made 40 appearances and scored two goals during the 2019–20 season, which culminated in defeat in the 2020 Championship play-off Final.

After beginning the 2020–21 season as an ever-present in league matches, Pinnock signed a new five-year contract on 10 November 2020. He made 48 appearances and two goals during a 2020–21 season which ended with promotion to the Premier League, after victory in the 2021 Championship play-off Final. In recognition of his league performances during the season, Pinnock was named in the 2020–21 PFA Championship Team of the Year.

Pinnock began the 2021–22 season as an ever-present starter in Premier League matches and he scored his only goal of the campaign in a 3–3 draw with Liverpool on 25 September 2021. Pinnock remained a virtual-ever present until suffering a season-ending hamstring injury on his 35th appearance, during a 2–1 victory over Watford on 16 April 2022. A knee injury suffered in July 2022 saw Pinnock miss the entire 2022–23 pre-season and the first two months of the regular season.

International career
In October 2016, Pinnock was called up to the England C national team and won his only cap in a 2–1 win over Estonia U23 in November 2016. In March 2021, Pinnock was one of six English-born players to receive their first call-up to the Jamaica national team for a friendly match versus the United States. He played the opening 64 minutes of the 4–1 defeat. In June 2021, Pinnock was named in Jamaica's provisional 2021 Gold Cup squad, but was not named in the final selection.

Personal life
Pinnock is of Jamaican descent on his father's side and he is a cousin of former footballer Nyron Nosworthy. He attended Shirley High School, Reigate College and graduated with a 2:1 in physical education from the University of Greenwich in 2015. Prior to transferring to Forest Green Rovers in 2016, Pinnock worked for a sports coaching company.

Career statistics

Club

International

Honours
Dulwich Hamlet
Isthmian League Division One South: 2012–13

Forest Green Rovers
National League play-offs: 2017

Brentford
EFL Championship play-offs: 2021

Individual
Dulwich Hamlet Supporters Player of the Year: 2014–15
Dulwich Hamlet Players' Player of the Year: 2014–15, 2015–16
Barnsley Player of the Year: 2018–19
Barnsley Player of the Month: December 2018
PFA EFL League One Team of the Year: 2018–19
EFL League One Team of the Year: 2018–19
PFA EFL Championship Team of the Year: 2020–21

References

External links
Ethan Pinnock at brentfordfc.com

1995 births
Living people
Footballers from Lambeth
English footballers
England semi-pro international footballers
Jamaican footballers
Jamaica international footballers
Association football defenders
Dulwich Hamlet F.C. players
Forest Green Rovers F.C. players
Barnsley F.C. players
Brentford F.C. players
Isthmian League players
National League (English football) players
English Football League players
Black British sportspeople
English people of Jamaican descent
Premier League players
Holmesdale F.C. players
Alumni of the University of Greenwich